Events from the year 1517 in art.

Events
 Hans Baldung leaves Freiburg and returns to Strasbourg.
 Sebastiano del Piombo begins painting The Raising of Lazarus (circa 1517).
 Perugino completes the altarpiece for the San Agostino Church in Perugia.
 Pontormo begins work on Joseph in Egypt (completed in 1518).
 Raphael begins decorating the Logge Vaticane (completed in 1519).
 Domenico Fancelli completes sculpting the tomb of the Catholic Monarchs in the Royal Chapel of Granada.

Works

 Andrea del Sarto – Madonna of the Harpies
 Hans Baldung – Death and the Maiden
 Lucas Cranach the Elder – Portrait of a Saxon Princess
 Niklaus Manuel Deutsch – Death and the Maiden
 Lorenzo Lotto – Susanna and the Elders
 Quentin Matsys – Portrait of Desiderius Erasmus
Pontormo – St. Quentin
Raphael
Christ Falling on the Way to Calvary (Lo Spasimo; approximate date)
The Path of Suffering
Raphael's workshop
frescos for "Raphael Rooms" in the Apostolic Palace of the Vatican
The Coronation of Charlemagne (probably executed by Gianfrancesco Penni)
The Oath of Leo III

Births
September 6 - Francisco de Holanda, Portuguese humanist and painter (born  1517, died 1585)
December 15 - Giacomo Gaggini, Italian sculptor (died 1598)
date unknown
Frans Floris, Flemish painter and one of a large family trained to the study of art in Flanders (born  1517, died 1570)
Willem Mahue, Flemish painter (died 1569)
approximate date - Antonis Mor, Dutch portrait painter (died 1577)
 1517/1524: Niccolò Circignani, Italian painter of the late-Renaissance or Mannerist period (died 1596)

Deaths
January 5 – Francesco Raibolini known as Francesco Francia, Bolognese painter and medalist (born 1450)
October 31 – Fra Bartolommeo, Florentine painter (born 1472)
date unknown
 Nikola Božidarević, Croatian painter (born 1460)
 Cima da Conegliano, Italian Renaissance painter (born 1459 or 1460, died 1517 or 1518)
 Guidoccio Cozzarelli - Italian Renaissance painter and miniaturist (born 1450)

References

 
Years of the 16th century in art